Tushar Ranganath (31 March 1974 – 20 December 2011), also known as Ranganth or Ranganna, was a Sandalwood movie director. Born and raised in Bangalore, India, Ranganath made his directorial debut with Gulama. He died due to cardiac arrest on 20 December 2011.

Filmography
Director
Gulama (2009)
Kanteerava (2010)
Sugreeva (2010)
Writer
 Gaandhinagara 
Rakshasa (2005)
Namma Basava (2005)
Auto Shankar (2005) 
Suntaragali (2006)
Duniya (2006)
Masthi (2007)
Anatharu (2007)
Aramane (2008)
Gange Baare Tunge Baare (2008)
Kiran Bedi (2009)
Swayamvara (2010)
Devru (2010)
Kari Chirate (2010) 
Aithalakkadi (2010)
Prem Adda (2012)

References

2011 deaths
Kannada film directors
1974 births
21st-century Indian film directors
Kannada screenwriters